Sterculiaceae was a family of flowering plant based on the genus Sterculia. Genera formerly included in Sterculiaceae are now placed in the family Malvaceae, in the subfamilies: Byttnerioideae, Dombeyoideae, Helicteroideae and Sterculioideae.

As traditionally circumscribed the Sterculiaceae, Malvaceae, Bombacaceae, and Tiliaceae comprise the "core Malvales" of the Cronquist system and the close relationship among these families is generally recognized. Sterculiaceae may be separated from Malvaceae sensu stricto by the smooth surface of the pollen grains and the bilocular anthers.

Numerous phylogenetic studies have revealed that Sterculiaceae, Tiliaceae and Bombacaceae as traditionally defined are cladistically polyphyletic. The APG and APG II systems unite Bombacaceae, Malvaceae sensu stricto, Sterculiaceae and Tiliaceae into a more widely circumscribed Malvaceae, i.e., Malvaceae sensu lato. In that view the taxa formerly classified in Sterculiaceae are treated in the subfamilies Byttnerioideae, Dombeyoideae, Helicteroideae and Sterculioideae of the Malvaceae sensu lato. The Thorne system takes an intermediate approach in combining the bulk of the traditional Sterculiaceae (but not including Sterculia itself) with elements of the traditional Tiliaceae to form the family Byttneriaceae.

Sterculiaceae had previously been recognized as a family by most systematists; in its traditional sense the family includes about 70 genera, totalling around 1,500 species of tropical trees and shrubs. The most famous products of the family are chocolate and cocoa from Theobroma cacao, followed by kola nuts. Many species yield timber.

A 2006 molecular study indicated the Sterculioideae was most likely to be a monophyletic group, and that it had four major clades within it. However, the relationships between the clades were not resolved.

Genera

Abroma Jacq
Acropogon Schltr
Aethiocarpa Vollesen
Astiria Lindl
Ayenia L.
Brachychiton Schott & Endl
Byttneria Loefl
Cheirolaena Benth
Chiranthodendron Larreat
Cola Schott & Endl
Commersonia J.R.Forst. & G.Forst
Cotylonychia Stapf
Dicarpidium F.Muell
Dombeya Cav.
Eriolaena DC
Firmiana Marsili
Franciscodendron B.Hyland & Steenis
Fremontodendron Coville
Gilesia F.Muell
Glossostemon Desf.
Guazuma Mill.
Guichenotia J.Gay
Hannafordia F.Muell
Harmsia K.Schum
Helicteres L.
Helmiopsiella Arenes
Helmiopsis H.Perrier
Heritiera Aiton
Hermannia L.
Herrania Goudot
Hildegardia Schott & Endl
Keraudrenia J.Gay
Kleinhovia L.
Lasiopetalum Sm.
Leptonychia Turcz
Leptonychiopsis Ridl
Lysiosepalum F.Muell
Mansonia J.R.Drumm. ex Prain
Maxwellia Baill.
Megatritheca Cristobal
Melhania Forssk.
Melochia L.
Neoregnellia Urb.
Nesogordonia Baill.
Octolobus Welw.
Paradombeya Stapf
Paramelhania Arenes
Pentapetes L.
Pimia Seem.
Pterocymbium R.Br.
Pterospermum Schreb.
Pterygota Schott & Endl
Rayleya Cristobal
Reevesia Lindl
Ruizia Cav.
Rulingia R.Br.
Scaphium Schott & Endl
Scaphopetalum Mast
Seringia J.Gay
Sterculia L.
Theobroma L.
Thomasia J.Gay
Triplochiton K.Schum
Trochetia DC
Trochetiopsis Marais
Ungeria Schott & Endl
Waltheria L.

Notes

References
 Whitlock, B. A., C. Bayer, and D. A. Baum. 2001. Phylogenetic Relationships and Floral Evolution of the Byttnerioideae ("Sterculiaceae" or Malvaceae s.l.) Based on Sequences of the Chloroplast Gene, ndhF. Systematic Botany 26: 420–437 (abstract online here).
 Wilkie, P., Clark, A., Pennington, R. T., Cheek, M., Bayer, C. & Wilcock, C. C. (2006).Phylogenetic Relationships within the Subfamily Sterculioideae (Malvaceae/Sterculiaceae-Sterculieae) Using the Chloroplast Gene ndhF. Systematic Botany 31(1):160-170.

External links
 Sterculiaceae in L. Watson and M.J. Dallwitz (1992 onwards) The families of flowering plants: descriptions.
 Malvaceae/Sterculiaceae - Sterculieae at the Royal Botanic Garden Edinburgh

Malvales families
Historically recognized angiosperm families